Kate Camp (born 1972) is a New Zealand poet and author who currently resides in Wellington.

Early life and education
Camp was born in 1972 in Wellington, New Zealand. She has a BA in English from the Victoria University of Wellington.

Career 
Poems by Camp have appeared in the Best New Zealand Poems series in 2001, 2002, 2003, 2010, 2012, and 2013. She has also been published in numerous literary magazines, including Landfall, New Zealand Books, New Zealand Listener, Sport, Takahe, Brick (Canada), Akzente (Germany) and Qualm (England).

Camp hosted a monthly radio segment, 'Kate's Klassics' on Kim Hill's radio show Saturday Morning on Radio New Zealand National. Camp currently works at the Museum of New Zealand Te Papa Tongarewa as the head of marketing and communications.

Awards 
At the 1999 Montana New Zealand Book Awards Camp's collection, Unfamiliar Legends of the Stars, won the NZSA Jessie Mackay Award for Best First Book of Poetry.

In 2011, The Mirror of Simple Annihilated Souls won the award for poetry at the New Zealand Post Book Awards and was shortlisted for the Kathleen Grattan Poetry Award. In 2013, Snow White’s Coffin was a finalist in the Poetry category of the New Zealand Post Book Awards.

In 2006 and 2004 she was shortlisted for the Glenn Schaeffer Prize in Modern Letters.

Residencies and fellowships 
Camp was a Writer in Residence at Waikato University in 2002. At the conclusion of the residency, her collection On Kissing was published by Four Winds Press.

In 2011 she received the Creative New Zealand Berlin Writers’ Residency and in 2016 she received the prestigious Katherine Mansfield Menton Fellowship.

Selected works 
Camp has published several collections of poems including:
 Unfamiliar Legends of the Stars (1998, Victoria University Press)
 Realia (2001, Victoria University Press)
  Beauty Sleep (2005, Victoria University Press)
 The Mirror of Simple Annihilated Souls (2010, Victoria University Press)
 Snow White’s Coffin (2013, Victoria University Press)
 The Internet of Things (2017, Victoria University Press)
In 2002 she published the collection of essays On Kissing.

In 2022 she published the memoir You Probably Think This Song Is About You.

References 

Living people
1972 births
New Zealand women poets
Victoria University of Wellington alumni
People from Wellington City
People associated with the Museum of New Zealand Te Papa Tongarewa